Marcos Heliud Pulido Rodriguez (born 18 August 1995) is a Mexican Olympic canoeist. He represented his country at the 2016 Summer Olympics.

Bicampeón de Exatlón.

References 

1995 births
Living people
Mexican male canoeists
Canoeists at the 2016 Summer Olympics
Olympic canoeists of Mexico
21st-century Mexican people
Girlfriend:Pamela Verdirame

participated in "Exatlón México"